Berkeley Lake is a city in Gwinnett County, Georgia, United States. It is a northern suburb of Atlanta. From its 1956 origins as a summer retreat, Berkeley Lake has grown into a thriving community centered on its  namesake lake. As of the 2020 census, the city had a population of 2,054. It has been named a Tree City USA for 18 years.

History
The majority of lands in the city limits (the  Berkeley Lake Properties) were developed by Frank Coggins in the late 1940s. The dam, constructed in 1948, is one of the largest earthen dams in the state. The city's namesake, Lake Berkeley, was named after Mr. Coggins' Berkeley Blue Granite Quarries in Elberton. In 1950 the Berkeley Lake "subdivision," which included five reserved Free Pass and Repass tracts (FPR) and the residential and fishing lots around the lake, was laid out. In 1952, Calvin and Kate Parsons, along with John and Dorothy Bagwell, purchased the Berkeley Realty & Investment Company and its  property.

For many years, Berkeley Lake was primarily a summer retreat, with an assortment of fishing cottages mingling with a slowly growing number of permanent homes. The health of the lake was guarded by a small, but tenacious, core of residents, each lending their expertise and time.

In 1953, some 25 property owners met and formed the Lake Berkeley Civic Association. Besides zoning and developmental control, there were important needs such as electricity, telephones, and "an all year road" around the lake. This need for benefits that an incorporated city could help secure brought about the creation of its charter, which was approved by the General Assembly of Georgia on March 6, 1956. A new municipality to be known as the City of Berkeley Lake was created in Gwinnett County.

Over the years since the city's incorporation, a number of ordinances have been passed to protect the character and tranquility of the community. In addition, a comprehensive master plan for future land use and growth was developed and adopted.

Since 1994, five new subdivisions have been added to nearly complete the development of all the land within the city limits. Only two tracts of over  remain. This property, which provides both buffer and greenspace, was acquired by the city in December 1996. 

In 2009, the city received record-breaking rainfall and the Lake Berkeley Dam was damaged. The lake was subsequently drained and, with the help of FEMA, repaired. The Lake Berkeley Dam repairs were completed in 2013, and the lake returned to full pool in 2014.

Geography
Berkeley Lake is in western Gwinnett County, bordered by Duluth to the east, Peachtree Corners to the south and west, and Johns Creek to the north. The northern boundary of the city follows the Chattahoochee River, which is also the Fulton County line. Peachtree Industrial Boulevard is the main road through the city. The community consists of several subdivisions around an  private lake.

Demographics

2020 census

As of the 2020 United States census, there were 2,054 people, 687 households, and 592 families residing in the city.

2010 census
As of the census of 2010, there were 1,574 people, 472 households, and 474 families residing in the city. The racial makeup of the city was 75.5% White, 5.7% African American, 0.1% Native American, 14.3% Asian, 1.3% from other races, and 3.1% from two or more races. Hispanic or Latino of any race were 3.6% of the population.

There were 572 households, out of which 37.2% had children under the age of 18 living with them, 75.7% were married couples living together, 5.6% had a female householder with no husband present, and 17.1% were non-families. 13.3% of all households were made up of individuals, and 5.8% had someone living alone who was 65 years of age or older.  The average household size was 2.75 and the average family size was 3.04.

In the city, the population was spread out, with 25.3% under the age of 18, 3.9% from 18 to 24, 18.7% from 25 to 44, 40.4% from 45 to 64, and 11.7% who were 65 years of age or older. The median age was 46.0 years. For every 100 females, there were 98.5 males.  For every 100 females age 18 and over, there were 92.6 males.

According to the 2015 American Community Survey, the median income for a household in the city was $118,571, and the median income for a family was $130,100. Males had a median income of $104,643 versus $65,417 for females. The per capita income for the city was $51,773.  About 3.3% of families and 3.0% of the population were below the poverty line, including 1.9% of those under age 18 and 7.9% of those age 65 or over.

Education
Berkeley Lake residents are zoned to Duluth cluster schools in the Gwinnett County Public Schools system: Berkeley Lake Elementary, Duluth Middle, and Duluth High School.

Infrastructure

Roads and expressways
A number of collector roads distribute traffic around both incorporated and unincorporated areas of the city.

Transit systems
Gwinnett County Transit serves the city.

Pedestrians and cycling
 The Loop Trail (Under construction)
 Western Gwinnett Bikeway

References

External links

 City of Berkeley Lake official website
 Berkeley Lake community website

Cities in Georgia (U.S. state)
Cities in Gwinnett County, Georgia
Populated places established in 1956